Olga Lenskiy (born 24 December 1992) is a Ukrainian-born Israeli sprinter. She competed in the 200 metres at the 2015 World Championships in Athletics in Beijing without advancing from the first round.

Personal life
Her mother Irina Lenskiy is also a sprinter.

International competitions

Personal bests
Outdoor
100 metres – 11.42 (+0.5 m/s, Tel Aviv 2014)
200 metres – 23.18 (Yerino 2015)
Indoor
60 metres – 7.51 (Prague 2015)

See also
List of Israeli records in athletics

References

Israeli female sprinters
Jewish Israeli sportspeople
Living people
Place of birth missing (living people)
1992 births
World Athletics Championships athletes for Israel
Athletes (track and field) at the 2015 European Games
European Games medalists in athletics
European Games bronze medalists for Israel